Al-Arqam is a Malaysian-based Islamic religious sect, founded by Ashaari Mohammad. The sect was banned by the Malaysian federal government on 21 October 1994. More than 5 Al-Arqam members including Ashaari Mohammad (leader of movement) were arrested under Internal Security Act (ISA) in Thailand and were flown back to Malaysia to be detained.

The sect is associated with the Global Ikhwan group of companies. Since the banning of Al-Arqam, a number of activities sponsored by the group have been attracted widespread media attention and criticism, including the Ikhwan Polygamy Club and the Obedient Wives Club, which have been seen as attempts to revive Al-Arqam.

Two books written by Khadijah Aam, Ashaari Mohammad's wife, have been banned on religious grounds, including the claim that Ashaari Mohammad had been empowered by Allah with supernatural powers.

Origins

The movement, also known as Darul Arqam, started life as a relatively small group that withdrew into its own fairly remote peasant-style, self-contained community that practised strict adherence to an Islamic code and developed a home-based economy. In 1968, when Ashaari, who was an ex-government religious teacher, commenced a low profile halaqah (study group circle) at Kampung Datuk Keramat, a Malay suburb of Kuala Lumpur.

Initially, the group was better known as the Rumah Putih (white house) since the house where they met was painted white. In the initial two years of its existence, the group received negative and sometimes apprehensive public response as the members stood out in their attire of white robes. At one stage, the group was accused by its neighbourhood of being dakwah songsang which meant deviating from orthodox Islamic teachings and hence to be confronted.  Yet the group grew and was attracting an increasing number of young Malays.

On 28 February 1971, the group decided to change its name to Darul Arqam, in memory of a companion to Prophet Muhammad, Arqam ibn Abi Arqam, who allowed his house in Makkah to be used as the early meeting place for Muslims.  Ashaari and his followers attempted to join other dakwah groups such as the Jamaat al-tabligh and ABIM.  They attempted to join the former but withdrew due to methodological and philosophical differences.  Later they joined ABIM of which they enjoyed a cordial and friendly relationship.  For instance, Ashaari himself was even offered a post as ABIM chief in Selangor of which he declined.  He was later appointed ABIM chief of the dakwah bureau in the same state.

Sungai Penchala

1975 marked a new and significant chapter in Al-Arqam's history when the movement moved to a new and permanent premise in five-hectare land at Kampung Sungai Penchala, twenty kilometres northeast of downtown Kuala Lumpur closed north from Taman Tun Dr Ismail.  The Arqam village at Sungai Penchala did not only become the main base but also became a model of an ideal Islamic village.  The five-hectare land encompassed a mosque, a lecture hall, dormitories, offices, a school, houses and shops.  The movement's dakwah mission became more organised and were subsequently augmented by the publication of books, magazines, newspapers, and production of audio-visual materials.

Membership and structure

Al-Arqam was an urban based movement and its membership was heavily drawn from educated Malays.  There was no official membership as members need not fill a form or pay a fee for one can be accepted into the fold as long as one subscribed to the rules of Islamic teachings, participated in the movement's programs and sacrificed oneself for the sake of religion, one automatically became an Arqam member.  Hence, it is very difficult to give an accurate estimation of the membership numbers although it was estimated that prior to its ban the group had between 10,000 and 12,000 members excluding sympathies and associate members.  It was also estimated that the movement had as many as 200,000 sympathizers.

Many of those who joined the group were from peasant origins but it also attracted support from middle-class urban Malays, including those from the government service.

Al-Arqam's organisational structure was called the Majlis Syuyukh.  The administration was headed by Amir Muhammadiah, who was Ashaari himself whom in turn, was assisted by two deputies called Amir Representative One and Amir Representative Two.  His three sons, Fakrul Razi (Amir's Representative 2), Mohd Nizamuddin (Assistant Representative of Principal Amir 1), Mohd Nasrullah (Deputy Amir 2) and his son-in-law Khairul Anuar Ujang (Vice Principal Amir 2) were securely placed in important positions.

Arqamnomics

The movement was perhaps famous for its approach to economics. Arqamomics refers to Al-Arqam approach to the economy – an approach that embraces Islamic philosophies, theories and practices.  The three principles undergirding Arqamnomics were not to seek excessive profits or accumulate wealth, an Islamic economy were based on human energy, natural resources, expertise, knowledge, economic thinking, effort, consistency and prayers and finally, an economy free from riba (interest), monopoly, forbidden sources, unpaid loan, fraud and deception.

The movement attempted to build a chain of business activities locally and abroad and it was considered successful in integrating its principles in almost every aspect of its economic activities.  Al-Arqam's main emphasis was on producing halal (permissible) food which was managed by its Department of Economic Affairs.  For almost 16 years from 1977 to 1994, Al-Arqam's economic activities were centred on the fardu kifayah economy which included halal food and beverages, retail outlets such as mini markets, groceries and book shops and a distribution centre.

The Arqam Group of Companies was officially launched in 1993, the movement expanded its economic activities to include commercial and strategic interests. Its technology industry, managed by the Science and Technology Department, ventured into the advanced technology by establishing Spectra Technology, a company which provided maintenance service to oil companies such as Esso Production, Shell Oil Refinery, Petronas Group of Companies and also a semi-government state utility company, Tenaga Nasional Berhad.

Arqam's Department of Agriculture acquired  of land to set up its Agricultural Complex Training Centre at Batu Hampar, Manjung, Perak.  The Department also owned a   paddy field in Penang and a  plantation in Sabah. It land assets were valued at RM 8.9 million whereas the value of its vehicle and machinery equipment reached RM 3.7 million.  The movement also operated businesses and own properties in Southeast Asia, the Middle East and Central Asia. In Indonesia, the movement set up soya and shoe factories at Tasikmalaya, hairdressing saloon and grocery stores in Jakarta and Medan and in Singapore, the movement ran a chain of grocery shops.

Socio-religious activities

Al-Arqam was focused on missionary activities and they were pursued domestically and internationally.  Their missionary activities were performed in the form of religious discourse or talk which members or sympathizers of the movement would organise the religious discourse in their house.  They would invite the people in the neighbourhood to attend it.  Al-Arqam's base at Sungai Pencala would be another place to stage such religious discourses.

The main attraction of Arqam's religious talks was it leaders' ability, especially Ashaari, to deliver lectures which attracted thousands of people all over Peninsular Malaysia.  Arqam's missionary activities also expanded abroad as one of their goals was to open as many branches as possible.  According to Muhammad Syukri Salleh (1995), Al-Arqam branches were set up with largely indigenous membership around the world especially in Southeast Asia and Europe.

As technology improved, Al-Arqam's religious lectures were recorded and distributed by the movement's two companies – Tele-Video Arqam and Audio-Video-Arqam.  Its cassettes and videos were sold in the thousands and prior to the ban, Al-Arqam nasyid (religious songs) group, Nada Murni, were regularly screened on the government-controlled television and radio station- Radio Televisyen Malaysia (RTM).  With regards to the print media, Al-Arqam's official newspaper was first published in July 1977 in the Jawi script with the circulation of 25,000.  All these media activities were administered by the movement's Department of Information.

Education was another important aspect of Al-Arqam's social activities.  Administered by its Department of Guidance and Education, Al-Arqam's primary and secondary schools drew controversies as they were not formally registered with the state and had a different syllabus from the official national curriculum.  It only emphasised on religious education. In 1994, the movement had 257 schools throughout Malaysia with an enrolment of 9541 students and 696 teachers.  The movement also set up its own 'university' at Pekan Baru, Indonesia.

Al-Arqam's social welfare model was premised on the concept of maasy (equality of income distribution based on needs).  In this socialist-style arrangement, all members regardless of occupation received a salary based on needs.  The nature of the job and qualification were not a factor in determining one's salary as the movement's maasy concept was based on the needs of the person concerned. For example, an electrician with five children would receive a higher income than a doctor with no children.  Ashaari himself articulated that the movement was trying to maintain the ukhwah Islamiah (a bond of brotherhood) which aimed to distribute resources to the underprivileged and needy.

Challenges to the state

In 1986, the religious authorities was alarmed by Ashaari's book Aurad which claimed that Prophet Muhammad and the four caliphs not only could be met in a dream but also could be confronted physically and consciously in the real world. The government's Islamic Developmental Department (JAKIM) argued that some facts and arguments were misleading and could jeopardise the beliefs of the Malaysian Muslims.  The National Fatwa Committee proscribed the book in 1998. The ban turned into a political controversy when Ashaari refused to abide by it and challenged the decision.

Ashaari decided to leave the country when the issue was debated between the religious establishments and the mainstream media. There was a tug-of-war between Al-Arqam and JAKIM as the foreign-based Ashaari challenged the religious authority to prove that he was wrong. Although he was based abroad, several of Ashaari's books were published and circulated in Malaysia by Al-Arqam to defend the movement's position. The movement also presented an official clarification from Islamic scholars to justify their claim and amongst the scholars were the former Mufti of Brunei, a lecturer in Islamic Studies from Universiti Kebangsaan Malaysia and several religious leaders from the pondok and madrasah systems.

The banning of the book Aurad was the beginning of a series of allegations against the movement. Accusations were also made on the widespread malpractice by the movements. According to a publication by Kedah Islamic Affairs Department, the alleged un-Islamic practices included the claim of Prophet Muhammad's attendance at the movement's spiritual healing service, Ashaari's claim that he could identify which member would go to heaven and Ashaari could act as the middle man to communicate with Syeikh Muhammad As-Suhaimi and in turn, the Syeikh can communicate with Prophet Muhammad. The authorities were most concerned with his ability to disseminate the idea that he was the great iman and had the ability to use magical power against the people opposing him. To strengthen his position in the movement and to win the admiration and respect from members of Al-Arqam, Ashaari made indirect self-proclamations that he was the direct descendant of Prophet Mohammed through the Bani Tamin tribe and his followers should address him as Syeikh Abuya Iman Ashaari Muhammad At-Tamini.

The absolute loyalty paid to Ashaari by his followers meant the leader was given a free hand to chart the social and religious discourse of the movement. The authorities were also particularly concerned by Ashaari's alleged interpretation of the Quran that a man was initially allowed to have two, then three and finally four wives. This was compared with the establishment's interpretation that a man was allowed to marry more than one wife only when the man was materially and physically stable and the man must love all his wives equally. Ashaari himself had four wives and reportedly fathered nearly forty children. The movement was also accused of performing marriages without the approval from the state Islamic affairs department.

It has been claimed that Ashaari planned to form an Islamic government in Malaysia. The plan, according to close associates of Ashaari, was conceived from Ashaari's claims that he had regular contact with Mohammad and according to Ashaari, the prophet advised him on the eventual arrival of the Mahdi in Makkah with a caliph from Malaysia. Ashaari saw himself as the caliph in the region's empire and divided the administration of the region into Malaysia 1 and Malaysia 2. Malaysia 1 would comprise Peninsula Malaysia and the Borneo states of Sabah and Sarawak and Malaysia 2 covered Indonesia, Brunei, the Philippines and Singapore.

Ashaari himself created further political controversy with his claim that the Prophet and himself also discussed Malaysian politics, forecasting the eventual downfall of the Mahathir government within six months to six years. He also predicted if Malaysians go to a referendum, he would be more popular than the Prime Minister himself. However, Ashaari denied harnessing his movement toward anti-government activities and argued that everything he did was politics and all he wanted was to see a Malaysian society which loves God and is always mindful of the hereafter.

To add more complexities into the issue, some UMNO politicians were involved in the movement and as a result, the ruling party decided to conduct an investigation on several party leaders and members who were known to be Al-Arqam sympathizers. One MP, Tamrin Ghafar who is a son of former Malaysian Deputy Prime Minister Ghafar Baba, admitted he was a member of the group. From the UMNO-led government's point of view, these revelations proved that the movement was able to penetrate into the core of the Malaysian political system and garnered considerable sympathy inside the establishment. The government itself estimated that about 7000 civil servants were involved in the movement itself and after assessing the situation, the government decided to take action against the movement before the situation became beyond the authorities' control. Thus in 1994, the National Fatwa Committee issued a religious decree against the organisation, citing the organisation as 'deviant' and 'deviationist'.

Possible existence of a revolutionary army

The movement's apparent radicalism first alarmed the authorities when nineteen Malaysian students of Al-Arqam were arrested in Cairo for being allegedly associating with Islamic extremist groups in Egypt and further evidence revealed that the movement was preparing for armed rebellion.  The plan was revealed by former member Abdul Aziz Wahab who was also an ex-Malaysian Navy Assistant Chief. According to the plan, Ashaari planned to stage a coup d'état in the country and Abdul Aziz Wahab would be appointed the Minister of Defence if their plan succeeded. Abdul Aziz Wahab developed misgivings about the plan when Ashaari suddenly decided to go for the umrah to Mecca and he suspected should the plan fail, he would become the scapegoat while Ashaari escaped. Thus he decided to disclose the evidence to the police.

The authorities also disclosed that the movement had set up a 313-strong army called Tentera Badar believed to be trained in Thailand.  However, Al-Arqam fiercely denied the allegations in a letter which highlighted that the accusation of the armed group being trained in Thailand implied that Thailand was supporting such an army and would undermine Thai-Malaysian relations. The letter also stated there was no physical evidence of this claim. The Thai government, through its Ambassador to Malaysia categorically denied the existence of the alleged army.  Yet the Malaysian government countered the denials by revealing confessions from an Al-Arqam member Irshadi Abdullah who stated that he and several other Arqam members were among the first to undergo commando training.  In an unusual twist, a deputy minister in the Prime Minister's Department Abdul Hamid Othman later admitted that the Army of Badar did not exist in physical terms but rather it was a psychological game inculcated in the mind of the movement's members to believe it actually existed.

The Malaysian government was able to convince the public of the danger posed by the movement by labelling Al-Arqam as a militant group and was actively exposing the deviant activities and teachings via the government-controlled media. It was labelled a cult and was compared with the David Koresh group.

Arrest of Leaders

Finally, in September 1994, eighteen leaders were detained under the Internal Security Act (Malaysia). Ashaari himself was arrested by Thai authorities and returned to Malaysia. The leader was not arrested but was under house arrest and held incommunicado to all except for immediate family members. Ashaari would spend the next ten years in Labuan, a small island just off Borneo.  The commune settlements were all closed and all former members prohibited from 'intermingling' to revive the movement.

Outside Malaysia, the movement survived, including a large contingent of followers who moved to Singapore to build and operate a center in an area called the Malay Village in Geylang.  Ashaari himself blamed Anwar Ibrahim for the repressive measures taken against Al-Arqam and predicted that the Deputy Prime Minister would pay a political price for this.

Attempts at Revival

According to governmental and news reports, it was believed that former members might be trying at reviving the movement via the 'Rufuqa' corporation.  This group was founded by Ashaari in Rawang in spite of being under close surveillance by the state. It had 80 businesses under its wing in Malaysia: mini markets, cafeterias, herbal products, tourism, advertising, furniture, clinics, electronic and multimedia, childcare centres and publishing. According to a former member Sheikh Hussein Sheikh Omar, most of the group's businesses are not profitable and they exist to recruit new members to revive Al-Arqam. He also mentioned that employees were not paid salaries but rather channel the earnings to the leaders for a place in heaven.

In November 2006, the Malaysian government raided the upper floor of a bakery and arrested more than 100 people believed to be attempting to revive Al-Arqam. The authorities subsequently outlawed the group in December the same year. Prime Minister Abdullah Badawi said that legal action would be taken against anyone who tried to re-establish the Al-Arqam.

See also
 Ashaari Mohammad
 Obedient Wives Club

References 

Islam in Malaysia
Islamic branches
Islamic fundamentalism
1994 disestablishments in Malaysia